Sebastian Dungan began his career in film at Paramount Pictures and Warner Bros.-based Witt-Thomas Films and is a producer with such credits as Transamerica and Afternoon Delight (in post), and a principal partner of the independent film production company 72 Productions. He is a producer for Inequality for All with Robert Reich, which premiered at Sundance Film Festival in the Documentary Competition section, and won a U.S. Documentary Special Jury Award for Achievement in Filmmaking.

Career 
The son of American-born, Andrew Dungan and French-born Sylvaine Dungan, Sebastian started as a child actor. His biggest role was acting opposite Martin Sheen, playing his French son from an affair in 1983's Man, Woman and Child. His performance earned him a nomination for a Young Artist Award.

Dungan was selected for Variety'''s "10 Producers to Watch" 2012 list along with producing partner Jen Chaiken. He produced the 2013 Sundance award-winning films Afternoon Delight, director Jill Soloway's feature debut, and feature documentary Inequality for All.

Independently, he produced Transamerica which received two Academy Award nominations and won a Golden Globe and both the Best Female Lead and Best First Screenplay at the Independent Spirit Awards. Prior, Dungan worked at Paramount Pictures and at Warner Bros.-based Witt-Thomas Films where he was involved in developing such films as David O. Russell's Three Kings'' and Christopher Nolan's Insomnia.

Dugan is a graduate of Yale University and a partner in 72 Productions, which has offices in San Francisco and Los Angeles.

References

External Links 
 

American film producers
Living people
Yale University alumni
1972 births